John Christopher Lujack (pronounced Lu' jack; born January 4, 1925) is an American former professional football player who was a quarterback and defensive back for the Chicago Bears of the National Football League (NFL).  He played college football for the University of Notre Dame, winning the Heisman Trophy in 1947; he is the oldest living recipient of the Heisman Trophy.

Early life and college career
Lujack was born to Alice and John, in 1925 in Connellsville, Pennsylvania, the youngest of four sons and fifth child in a family of six children.  The family is of Polish descent and included older siblings Valentine ("Val"), Stanislaus  ("Stan"), Victoria, Aloysius ("Allie", who went on to play professional basketball), and younger sister Dolores.  His father, John,  worked for the  Pittsburgh and Lake Erie Railroad for thirty years as a boilermaker.

Lujack was on the Connellsville High School football team from 1939 to 1941, and was also senior class president and valedictorian.  In high school, he lettered in four sports; baseball, football, basketball, and track.

Lujack's 1941 high school team, named the Cokers for workers in the coal milling industry who feed the ovens, went 8–0–1, but did not get to play for the WPIAL league championship because their last game, with Brownsville, ended in a 13–13 tie.

People in Connellsville had wanted Lujack to go to the United States Military Academy (Army) at West Point, going so far as to ask their local congressman for an appointment, but Lujack, a fan of Notre Dame from listening to their football radio broadcasts, had his heart set on playing in South Bend.    He was the first Connellsville High School student to receive an appointment to Army.

Lujack attended Notre Dame, where he was given a scholarship by Frank Leahy, from 1942 to 1943 and then 1946 to 1947. His career was interrupted for two years by World War II after his sophomore season, during which he served as an officer in the United States Navy.  His time in the Navy was spent hunting German submarines in the English Channel as an ensign.

When Lujack returned from the Atlantic (ETO) duty, he appeared on the cover of the September 29, 1947, issue of LIFE.  He led the 1947 Fighting Irish to a 9–0 record for his senior year, during which he completed 61 passes on 109 attempts for 777 yards and rushed for 139 yards on 12 carries, and won the Heisman Trophy.  As he had in high school, Lujack once again received varsity letters (called "monograms") in four sports (again baseball, football, basketball, and track) while at Notre Dame, becoming the third person to do so.  He was a two-time unanimous All-American (1946 and 1947) and led Notre Dame to three national championships (1943, 1946 and 1947).  In addition to winning the Heisman, lujack was named Associated Press Athlete of the Year.

Professional career
Lujack was paid USD$17,000 for his 1948 rookie season with the Bears and $20,000 for his fourth and final season.  In his rookie season he played defensive back, during which he had eight interceptions for 131 yards and kicked 44 out of 46 extra points.

In the summer of 1949, Lujack starred in a radio program on ABC, The Adventures of Johnny Lujack, which was a summertime replacement for the Jack Armstrong, the All-American Boy show.  It was a 30-minute program and broadcast on Monday, Wednesday, and Friday.  The show was broadcast from the studios of WGN in Chicago over the Mutual Broadcasting System (MBS) and ran for 13 weeks.

In the final game of the 1949 season, the 9–3 Bears defeated their hometown rivals, the Chicago Cardinals (6–5–1), by a score of 52–21 on December 11.  In that game, Lujack threw six touchdown passes and set an NFL record with 468 passing yards. The record was broken later by Norm Van Brocklin. He was the last Bears quarterback to throw at least five touchdown passes in a game until Mitchell Trubisky threw six against the Tampa Bay Buccaneers in 2018.

Sid Luckman and George Blanda played behind Lujack in the rotation at quarterback for the 1949 and 1950 seasons.

During the 1950 season, Lujack set an NFL record with 11 rushing touchdowns by a quarterback.  This record was tied by Tobin Rote with the Green Bay Packers in 1956, and broken by the New England Patriots' Steve Grogan in 1976.  Lujack, named to the 1950 All-Pro First-team, also set a Bears record for 109 total points in a season with 11 touchdowns, three (out of five) field-goals, and 34 (out of 35) extra points.  That record was surpassed by Gale Sayers in 1965 with 123 total points.

Lujack was the first of several successful quarterbacks who hailed from Western Pennsylvania.  Others include Pro Football Hall of Fame members Johnny Unitas, Joe Namath, Dan Marino, Jim Kelly, Joe Montana and George Blanda.

Post-playing career
After four years with the Bears he returned to Notre Dame as an assistant coach for 1952 and 1953 to repay Frank Leahy as a debt of gratitude for having given him a scholarship to Notre Dame.  Leahy wanted Lujack to succeed him as the head coach of the Fighting Irish, but Terry Brennan was chosen instead by Reverend Theodore Hesburgh, the university president.

In 1954, he then went into the car dealership business with his father-in-law, at Lujack Schierbrock Chevrolet Company of Davenport, Iowa.  He sold his dealership interest to his son-in-law in 1988. Sometime in late 2006, Lujack's was sold by his ex son in law to Smart Automotive.

Lujack served as a television color commentator for several years, teaming with Chris Schenkel to call New York Giants games on CBS from 1958 to 1961.  However, in 1962 when Ford signed on as a major sponsor and  learned that Lujack was a Chevrolet dealer, he was replaced by Pat Summerall.  He also worked with Jim McKay on CBS doing college football and on ABC college football telecasts in the late 1960s.

On June 8, 1978, Lujack was inducted into the National Polish-American Sports Hall of Fame.

In 2005, he donated $50,000 to Connellsville High School toward a new field house for the football stadium.  It was later named Johnny Lujack Field House.  The Johnny Lujack Training Facility was formally dedicated in 2009 and he was also inducted into the inaugural class of the Fayette County Sports Hall of Fame.

He is the oldest living Heisman Trophy winner.

Personal life
His wife is the former Patricia Ann "Pat" Schierbrock, daughter of Josephine (née Wilson) and Frank H. Schierbrock.  Lujack and Schierbrock were married in Davenport, Iowa at the Sacred Heart Cathedral on June 26, 1949.  They have three children: Mary, Jeff, and Carol (1954–2002).

Lujack is distantly related to NFL player Ben Skowronek and Olympic gymnast Courtney Kupets, and NFL quarterback Trent Green married into the family.

Career statistics

College

Professional

References

External links
 
 
 

1925 births
Living people
All-American college football players
American Football League announcers
American football quarterbacks
American men's basketball players
American people of Polish descent
Basketball players from Pennsylvania
Chicago Bears players
College football announcers
College Football Hall of Fame inductees
Heisman Trophy winners
National Football League announcers
New York Giants announcers
Notre Dame Fighting Irish baseball players
Notre Dame Fighting Irish football coaches
Notre Dame Fighting Irish football players
Notre Dame Fighting Irish men's basketball players
Notre Dame Fighting Irish men's track and field athletes
People from Connellsville, Pennsylvania
Players of American football from Pennsylvania
Sportspeople from the Pittsburgh metropolitan area
Western Conference Pro Bowl players
United States Navy personnel of World War II
United States Navy officers
Military personnel from Pennsylvania